Oued El Alleug is a district in Blida Province, Algeria. It was named after its capital, Oued El Alleug.

Municipalities
The district is further divided into 3 municipalities:
Oued El Alleug
Béni Tamou
Ben Khéllil

Districts of Blida Province